Kerepes is a village in Pest county, Budapest metropolitan area, Hungary. It has a population of 9,903 (2008).

Notable people
Zoltán Sándor (born 1928), sports shooter

Twin towns – sister cities

Kerepes is twinned with:
 Dealu, Romania
 Dolné Obdokovce, Slovakia
 Hořice, Czech Republic
 Pabianice, Poland

References

External links

 in Hungarian

Populated places in Pest County